Hermina 'Mina' Morita (born September 2, 1954) is an adviser for the Hawaii State House Committee on Finance. She is the former chair of the Public Utilities Commission (PUC) of the State of Hawaii. She previously served as a Democratic member of the Hawaii House of Representatives, representing the state's 14th District between her election in 1996 and 2011, when she was appointed to the PUC. The district includes Hanalei, Princeville, and Kapaa on the island of Kauai. Morita was the chair of the House Committee on Energy and Environmental Protection.

On March 14, 2011, Morita was confirmed as chair of the Hawaii Public Utilities Commission. She was appointed by Governor Neil Abercrombie and is the first ever female chair of the PUC.

In January 2015, she announced her resignation from her position as Chair of the Public Utilities Commission. In February 2015, she said she will advise the Hawaii State House Committee on Finance.

References

External links
 Hawaii State Legislature - Representative Hermina Morita
 Project Vote Smart - Representative Hermina M. 'Mina' Morita

Democratic Party members of the Hawaii House of Representatives
1954 births
Living people
Hawaii politicians of Japanese descent
Women state legislators in Hawaii
American women of Japanese descent in politics
2020 United States presidential electors
21st-century American women